Anshan is a city in Liaoning province, PR China

Anshan may also refer to : 

Anshan (Persia), an ancient Persian capital
Izeh, a city in Izeh County, Khuzestan Province, Iran
Anshan, Hebei, China
Anshan-class destroyer
Chinese destroyer Anshan (101)
3136 Anshan,  a main-belt asteroid
A commonly used word for a hunger strike in India

See also
 Ansan (disambiguation)